Bandcamp is an American online audio distribution platform founded in 2007 by Oddpost co-founder Ethan Diamond and programmers Shawn Grunberger, Joe Holt and Neal Tucker, with headquarters in Oakland, California, US. On March 2, 2022, Bandcamp was acquired by Epic Games.

History 

Bandcamp was founded in 2007 by Ethan Diamond and programmers Shawn Grunberger, Joe Holt and Neal Tucker, headquartered in Oakland, California, US.

In 2010, the site enabled embedding in other websites and shared links on social media sites.

As of August 2020, half of Bandcamp's revenue was from sales for physical products.

In November 2020, Bandcamp launched Bandcamp Live, a ticketed live-streaming service for artists. The service is an integrated feature of the Bandcamp website. Fees on tickets were waived until March 31, 2021, and became 10% from then.

Bandcamp provides vinyl pressing services for artists. After a 50-artist pilot in 2020, the company opened limited access to 10,000 artists in early 2021 with plans for further expansion. Their fans preorder the pressing rather than having the artist fund it upfront. Bandcamp lets artists set their own price. The company's two million vinyl sales in 2020 doubled that of 2019.

Bandcamp was acquired by Epic Games on March 2, 2022. Epic said the platform “will play an important role in Epic’s vision to build out a creator marketplace ecosystem...". Ethan Diamond said “Bandcamp will keep operating as a stand-alone marketplace and music community...".

Business model
Artists and labels upload music to Bandcamp and control how they sell it, setting their own prices, offering users the option to pay more, and selling merchandise.

Users can download their purchases or stream their music on the Bandcamp application or website only once or, by preserving the purchase voucher, unlimited times. They can also send purchased music as a gift, view lyrics, and save individual songs or albums to a wish list. Uploading music to Bandcamp is free. The company takes a 15% commission on sales made from their website, which drops to 10% after an artist's sales surpass US$5,000, plus payment processing fees.

Downloads are offered in lossy formats MP3 (LAME, 320k or V0), AAC and Ogg Vorbis, and in lossless formats FLAC, ALAC, WAV and AIFF. In addition to digital downloads artists may offer to sell their music on physical media such as CD or vinyl.

Bandcamp's website offers users access to an artist's page, with information on the artist, social media links, merchandising links and listing their available music. Artists can change the look of their page and customize its features.

Charity 
During the COVID-19 pandemic, in 2020 Bandcamp announced that they would be waiving their share of revenue and donating all sales to artists for 24 hours on March 20. They repeated the initiative in the following months and began calling these days "Bandcamp Fridays"; they are scheduled once every month and the website Is It Bandcamp Friday? was established to provide timing clarity to those outside the Pacific Time Zone. After raising more than $40 million for its musicians in 2020 through Bandcamp Fridays, the platform extended the program to four additional dates in 2021.

In response to the protests that took place following the murder of George Floyd and other African Americans who had died from police violence, Bandcamp announced that for 24 hours on June 19, 2020 they would donate 100% of profits to the NAACP Legal Defense Fund.

Notable artists and labels
Bandcamp gained much attention in July 2010 when Amanda Palmer, Low Places and Bedhed gave up their record labels and started selling albums on Bandcamp, using Twitter for promotion.

Will Toledo initially released his 2011 studio album Twin Fantasy on Bandcamp. The album has since gained a cult following, thanks to online forums Reddit and 4chan, and has been downloaded over 33,000 times.

Several indie game developers published their game soundtracks on Bandcamp, including the creators of Aquaria, Bastion, Cuphead, Sanctum, Machinarium, Terraria, Plants vs. Zombies, Limbo, Super Meat Boy, To the Moon, YIIK: A Postmodern RPG, Fez, Minecraft, Undertale, Deltarune, and Stardew Valley.

In December 2014, Bandcamp for Labels was launched. Popular independent labels such as Sub Pop, Fat Wreck Chords, Relapse Records and Epitaph Records launched their own Bandcamp pages.

In November 2019, Peter Gabriel added his complete solo catalog to Bandcamp.

On June 18, 2020, Björk published her discography on the platform. In December, UK label Warp joined Bandcamp, this made records by Hudson Mohawke, Aphex Twin, Kelela and other available on the platform.

On October 21, 2021, Radiohead published their discography on the platform.

Bandcamp Daily
In the summer of 2016, their editorial content was expanded by launching Bandcamp Daily, an online music publication about artists on the platform. The publication is based in New York. Its managing editor is Jes Skolnik, a writer for Pitchfork, BuzzFeed and The New York Times, as well as former author of punk zines. Among Bandcamp Daily columnists have been writers of Wired, Vice, NPR Music, Pitchfork and Paste.

On August 4, 2017, the staff of Bandcamp Daily donated all of the day's sales proceeds to the Transgender Law Center, a civil rights organization for transgender people.

In February 2018, the audience of Bandcamp Daily had increased by 84% since the previous year.

References

External links
 

2008 establishments in California
American companies established in 2008
Companies based in Oakland, California
Digital audio distributors
Internet properties established in 2008
Online music stores of the United States
Music streaming services
Remote companies
Epic Games
2022 mergers and acquisitions